Chevy is a given name and nickname which may refer to:

 Chevy Chase (born 1943),  American actor, comedian, screenwriter and producer
 Chevy Stevens (born 1973 as Rene Unischewski), Canadian author of thriller novels
 Chevy Woods (born 1981), American rapper, singer and songwriter

See also
 Chevie Kehoe (born 1973), American white supremacist and convicted murderer